The Cheyenne High School at 2810 House Avenue in Cheyenne, Wyoming is a Late Gothic Revival-style building which was built in 1921.  It has also been known as Central High School and as Laramie County School District No.1 Administration Building and was listed on the National Register of Historic Places in 2005.

Its walls are reinforced concrete with brick faces. It was designed by architect William Dubois and built by contractor John W. Howard.

The school district served was eventually split up.  See Cheyenne Central High School, Cheyenne East High School, and Cheyenne South High School

References

School buildings on the National Register of Historic Places in Wyoming
Gothic Revival architecture in Wyoming
School buildings completed in 1921
Schools in Laramie County, Wyoming
1921 establishments in Wyoming